USAF Team Handball  is a handball club from Air Force Academy, Colorado, United States. They are the handball team of the United States Air Force Academy. They are one of the most successful men's college teams. Besides the Adelphi University and UCLA they are the only college team which has won an adult national title in 1978.

History
After the Falcons men's basketball became second at the 1976 USA Team Handball Nationals in the adults and collegiate divisions the club was founded in 1976 by the two basketball captains Bob Djokovich and Thomas Schneeberger they both played at the 1984 Los Angeles Summer Olympics.

At the 2015 Summer Universiade the club represented the national team. They had additionally one student from the Colorado State University.

Accomplishments
Nationals:
Men's Division I (as top tier):
1 ×  : 1978, 1977
2 ×  : 1976
Men's Division I (as second tier):
1 ×  : 2004
3 ×  : 2014, 2015, 2016
Men's Division II (as third tier):
2 ×  : 2000, 2003
1 ×  : 2001
College Nationals:
Men: 
3 ×  : 1977, 1978, 2002
3 ×  : 1976, 1980, 2000
10 ×  : 1999, 2004, 2006, 2007, 2008, 2009, 2014, 2016, 2017, 2019
Women:
1 ×  : 1988
1 ×  : 1980
Carolina Blue Cup (men) :
 : 1991

Olympians
Source:

Rankings

2017-18

* No Ranking was released.

2018-19

References

External links

Handball clubs established in 1978
1976 establishments in Colorado